Lindridge is a village and civil parish in the Malvern Hills District in  the north of the county of Worcestershire, England, near the Shropshire border and the town of Tenbury Wells. The area around the village is known for its extensive hop fields.

External links
 

Villages in Worcestershire
Civil parishes in Worcestershire